The architecture of Jacksonville is a combination of historic and modern styles reflecting the city's early position as a regional center of business. According to the National Trust for Historic Preservation, there are more buildings built before 1967 in Jacksonville than any other city in Florida, though few structures in the city center predate the Great Fire of 1901. Numerous buildings in the city have held state height records, dating as far back as 1902, and last holding a record in 1981.

Prominent architects
Contributing heavily during the reconstruction period following the Great Fire of 1901, a young New York architect named Henry John Klutho would come to influence generations of local designers. Klutho's works exhibit elements influenced by both the Chicago School, championed by Louis Sullivan, and the Prairie School of architecture, popularized by Frank Lloyd Wright. As a result, Jacksonville has one of the largest collections of Prairie Style buildings outside the Midwest.

By the 1950s, modernist design principles would permeate throughout the United States, transforming the rapidly growing State of Florida. During this period, local architects Robert C. Broward, Taylor Hardwick, and William Morgan adapted a range of design principles, including International style, Brutalism, Futurism and Organicism, all applied with an American interpretation generally referred to today as Mid-century modern design. The architecture firms of Reynolds, Smith & Hills (RS&H) and Kemp, Bunch & Jackson (KBJ) have also contributed a number of important works to the city's modern architectural movement. In particular, KBJ has designed more buildings in the contemporary skyline of Jacksonville than any other architectural firm. Of the 30 tallest buildings in the city, 17 are associated with KBJ. With the notable exception of works by Robert A.M. Stern Architects, Welton Becket, Paul Rudolph, and Helmut Jahn, many of Jacksonville's modern landmarks were designed locally.

Residential architecture

Houses

Few structures survive from the earliest period of Jacksonville's history, though there are a handful of notable exceptions. Built in 1797, Kingsley Plantation is the oldest surviving structure in the city and is currently maintained by the National Park Service as part of the Timucuan Ecological and Historic Preserve. Located on Fort George Island, the plantation is a unique two-story house that resembles 17th century British gentry homes. The Red Bank Plantation House is a Georgian Revival style structure built in 1854. Marabanong Mansion is a Queen Anne style home built in 1876. Napoleon Bonaparte Broward House, built in 1878, and the Merrill House, built in 1886, are two examples of Victorian style homes in Jacksonville.

The Great Fire of 1901 consumed much of central Jacksonville, leaving thousands homeless, and simultaneously sparked a significant period of growth lasting up until the end of the Florida Land Boom. Springfield, Riverside, Avondale, Eastside, Oakland and Fairfield had been platted and annexed into the city prior to the fire, and experienced much of the related growth after the disaster. Architect Henry John Klutho would become a popular figure in the reconstruction of Jacksonville, contributing his designs to many of the new structures, including dwellings. Built in 1902, The Thomas V. Porter House is a Classical Revival and Colonial Revival style mansion designed by Klutho. He is better known for his works in the Prairie School style of architecture. His own home, Henry John Klutho House, is a prime example. The architecture firm of Marsh & Saxelbye would also establish itself during this period of growth. In 1925, the firm designed the Tudor Revival style Lane-Towers House. More famously, Epping Forest, completed in 1927, is a Spanish Colonial Revival style mansion designed by Marsh & Saxelbye.

Following World War II, suburbs rapidly developed throughout the United States, due in large part to the rise of personal automobile ownership. Following the opening of the Mathews Bridge, Arlington would become the most important of these developments locally. This period also coincided with the popularization of Modern design in architecture. Designed by Robert C. Broward, the Butterfly House was completed in 1957 in the Arlington neighborhood. Its design elements, including the butterfly wing shaped roof, are sometime more broadly categorized today as Mid-century modern design. The Jacksonville Beaches also host a number of modern homes built during this period. Famed architect Paul Rudolph designed the iconic Milam House in 1961, which is on the National Register of Historic Places. William Morgan designed the Williamson House in 1966, and his own home, Morgan House, in 1974. Both are located on the beach.

Apartments and condominiums
 1913 Klutho Apartments, Prairie School, Henry John Klutho
 1923 John Gorrie, Renaissance Revival, Roy A. Benjamin and Mellen Clark Greeley (originally the John Gorrie Junior High School)
 1924 310 West Church Street Apartments, Georgian Revival/Beaux-Arts, Hentz, Reid & Adler (originally the Ambassador Hotel)
 1925 The Carling, Renaissance Revival, Thompson, Holmes & Converse
 1926 11 East Forsyth, Chicago school/Art Deco, Pringle & Smith (originally the Lynch Building)
 1949 City Place, Moderne
 1967 The Commander, Mid-century modern
 1968 Cathedral Towers, Brutalist, Kemp, Bunch & Jackson
 1970 Cathedral Townhouse, Brutalist, Kemp, Bunch & Jackson
 1972 Mount Carmel Garden Apartments, Brutalist
 1973 Riverside Presbyterian Apartments, Brutalist
 1974 Cathedral Terrace, Brutalist, Kemp, Bunch & Jackson
 1974 Hogan Creek Tower, Brutalist
 2003 Berkman Plaza
 2006 The Strands at St. Johns Center
 2006 San Marco Place
 2008 The Peninsula at St. Johns Center, Postmodern, 
 2015 220 Riverside, Modernist,
 2016 Brooklyn Riverside Apartments, Modernist,
 2018 Lofts at LaVilla, Modernist
 2018 Lofts at Monroe, Modernist
 2018 Broadstone River House, Modernist

Commercial architecture

Places of business

 1889 El Modelo Block
 1902 Old Florida National Bank, Classical Revival, Edward H. Glidden (originally the Mercantile Exchange Bank Building)
 1902 Dyal-Upchurch Building, Chicago school, Henry John Klutho
 1908 Bisbee Building, Chicago school/Prairie school, Henry John Klutho
 1909 121 Atlantic Place, Chicago school/Classical Revival, Mowbray and Uffinger (originally the Atlantic National Bank Building)
 1910 Morocco Temple, Egyptian Revival/Prairie school, Henry John Klutho
 1911 Florida Life Building, Chicago school/Prairie school, Henry John Klutho
 1912 Masonic Temple, Chicago school/Prairie school, Mark and Sheftall
 1925 Groover-Stewart Drug Company Building, Marsh & Saxelbye
 1926 Scottish Rite Masonic Center, Egyptian Revival/Art Deco, Roy A. Benjamin
 1926 Schultz Building, Chicago school/Classical Revival, Marsh & Saxelbye
 1926 Barnett National Bank Building, Chicago school, Mowbray and Uffinger
 1926 Elks Club Building, Mediterranean Revival, Roy A. Benjamin
 1927 Levy Building, Chicago school/Renaissance Revival, Marsh & Saxelbye
 1927 Hildebrandt Building, Chicago school/Renaissance Revival, Marsh & Saxelbye
 1928 Greenleaf & Crosby Building, Chicago school/Renaissance Revival, Marsh & Saxelbye
 1929 Title & Trust Company of Florida Building, Classical Revival, Marsh & Saxelbye
 1941 First Federal Savings and Loan Building, Art Deco
 1941 Furchgott Building, Art Deco, 
 1951 Jacksonville Transportation Authority Headquarters, Art Deco (originally the Atlantic National Bank Annex)
 1953 Old Peninsular Life Insurance Building, International style, Kemp, Bunch & Jackson (occupied by Fidelity National Financial)
 1955 Eight Forty One, International Style, Kemp, Bunch & Jackson (originally the Prudential Building)
 1955 Old Independent Life Building, International Style, Kemp, Bunch & Jackson
 1957 Midtown Centre, International Style/Mid-century modern, Ira M. Koger (originally the Koger Center)
 1958 Skinner Dairy, Mid-century modern, Taylor Hardwick
 1960 CSX Transportation Building, International Style/Mid-century modern, Kemp, Bunch & Jackson (originally the Atlantic Coast Line Railroad Building)
 1963 JEA Tower, Mid-century modern, Ketchum & Sharp  (originally the Universal-Marion Building)
 1965 Jessie Ball duPont Center, Mid-century modern, Taylor Hardwick
 1967 Riverplace Tower, International Style/Mid-century modern, Welton Becket, in association with Kemp, Bunch & Jackson (originally the Gulf Life Building)
 1967 Times-Union Building, International Style/Mid-century modern, Kemp, Bunch & Jackson
 1971 Blue Cross Blue Shield Building, Brutalist, Kemp, Bunch & Jackson
 1974 Wells Fargo Center, Modernist, Kemp, Bunch & Jackson (originally the Independent Life Building)
 1974 BB&T Building, Modernist, Kemp, Bunch & Jackson (originally the Atlantic National Bank Building)
 1982 Chart House, Organic/Modernist , Kendrick Bangs Kellogg 
 1983 EverBank Center, Modernist, Kemp, Bunch & Jackson (originally the Southern Bell Tower)
 1985 Two Prudential Plaza, Modernist, Kemp, Bunch & Jackson
 1985 Stein Mart Building, Modernist, Kemp, Bunch & Jackson
 1986 One Enterprise Center, Postmodern, Clark Tribble Harris & Li Architects  (originally the Florida National Bank Building)
 1986 Baptist Medical Pavilion, Brutalist,
 1989 VyStar Tower, Postmodern, Kemp, Bunch & Jackson (originally the American Heritage Life Building)
 1990 Bank of America Tower, Postmodern, Helmut Jahn (originally the Barnett Center)
 2003 Raymond James Building, Postmodern, Jess Walker of Morris Adjmi Architects
 2008 EverBank Plaza, Postmodern

Hotels
 1869 St. James Hotel (destroyed in 1901)
 1875 Windsor Hotel (destroyed in 1901)
 1908 Seminole Hotel, Chicago school/Prairie school, Henry John Klutho (demolished in 1974)
 1926 Hotel George Washington, Renaissance Revival, Marsh & Saxelbye (demolished in 1973)
 1928 Ribault Inn Club, Colonial Revival, Maurice Fatio and Mellen Clark Greeley
 1959 Hotel Robert Meyer, Mid-century modern (demolished in 1998)
 1975 Hyatt Regency Jacksonville Riverfront Annex, Brutalist/Modernist, William Morgan (originally the Davis State Building)
 1987 Omni Jacksonville Hotel
 2001 Hyatt Regency Jacksonville Riverfront

Shopping centers
 1959 Gateway Town Center
 1967 Regency Square Mall
 1987 Jacksonville Landing, Postmodern. Ben Thompson (demolished in 2020)
 1990 The Avenues
 2005 St. Johns Town Center

Institutional architecture

Government

 1886 County Courthouse (destroyed in 1901)
 1902 County Courthouse, Classical Revival, Rutledge Holmes (demolished)
 1909 Godbold Building, Chicago school/Prairie school, Henry John Klutho (Originally the YMCA Building)
 1912 St. James Building, Chicago school/Prairie school, Henry John Klutho
 1913 The Criminal Court Building, Prairie school, Henry John Klutho (demolished in 1968)
 1924 Federal Reserve Bank of Atlanta Jacksonville Branch, Georgian Revival, Henrietta Cuttino Dozier and A. Ten Eyck Brown
 1933 Ed Austin Building, PWA Moderne/Stripped Classicism, Marsh & Saxelbye (originally the United States Federal Courthouse)
 1952 Fire and Rescue Headquarters Building, Art Deco/Modernist, (originally the Federal Reserve Bank of Atlanta Jacksonville Branch)
 1958 Old Duval County Courthouse, International Style, Reynolds, Smith & Hills
 1960 City Hall Annex, Mid-century modern, Reynolds, Smith & Hills (Former City Hall)
 1961 Edward Ball Building, International Style (originally the Florida National Bank Building)
 1966 Charles E. Bennett Federal Building, Brutalist/Mid-century modern, Reynolds, Smith & Hills
 1977 Jacksonville Sheriff's Office Headquarters, Brutalist/Modernist, William Morgan
 2002 Bryan Simpson United States Courthouse, Postmodern, Kemp, Bunch & Jackson
 2012 Duval County Courthouse, Kemp, Bunch & Jackson

Education
 1905 Carnegie Library, Classical Revival, Henry John Klutho
 1916 Centennial Hall, Georgian Revival, Howells & Stokes
 1925 Bolles School, Mediterranean Revival, Marsh & Saxelbye
 1974 J. Henry Gooding Building on the Jacksonville University campus, Brutalist, Kemp, Bunch & Jackson
 2005 Main Library Building, Postmodern, Robert A. M. Stern
 2009 University of North Florida Student Union, Green/Modernist, Rink Design

Museums

Jacksonville is home to a variety of museums of varied styles. Completed in 1921, the Karpeles Manuscript Library Museum is a Classical Revival building originally constructed for the Church of Christian Scientist. It was designed by the local architecture firm Marsh & Saxelbye. Also designed by Marsh & Saxelbye, the Museum of Contemporary Art Jacksonville was originally built in 1931 for the Western Union Telegraph Company, and stands as one of Jacksonville's best examples of Art Deco in architecture. Another example of Art Deco is the Cummer Museum of Art and Gardens. Completed in 1961, the fine arts museum was designed by Saxelby & Powell. Constructed in 1965, the Jacksonville Art Museum was predecessor of what is now the Museum of Contemporary Art Jacksonville. Designed by Taylor Hardwick, the building is located in the Midtown Centre office complex. Originally built in 1969 as the Jacksonville Children's Museum, William Morgan's Brutalist designed museum currently houses the Museum of Science and History.

Houses of worship
 1883 St. George Episcopal Church, Carpenter Gothic, Robert Sands Schuyler
 1887 St. Andrew's Episcopal Church, Gothic Revival, Robert Sands Schuyler
 1903 Snyder Memorial Methodist Episcopal Church, Late Gothic Revival, J. H. W. Hawkins
 1904 Bethel Church, Greek Revival/Romanesque Revival , M. H. Hubbard
 1905 Mount Zion AME Church, Romanesque Revival, Francis J. Norton and J. B. Carr & Co.
 1906 St. John's Cathedral, Gothic Revival, Snelling and Potter
 1910 Basilica of the Immaculate Conception, Late Gothic Revival, M. H. Hubbard
 1917 Our Lady of the Angels Catholic Church, Late Gothic Revival
 1927 Riverside Baptist Church, Romanesque Revival, Addison Mizner
 1967 St. Paul's by-the-Sea Episcopal Church, Mid-century modern, Blake Ellis

Cultural architecture

Entertainment venues

The city host a number of music and performance venues, most notably the Florida Theatre. Designed by local architect Roy A. Benjamin, the Mediterranean Revival style theater opened in 1927. Benjamin designed a number of other local venues, including the Renaissance Revival style Riverside Theatre in 1927 and the Art Deco style San Marco Theatre in 1939. Designed by Jefferson Davis Powell in 1929, the Ritz Theatre is another local example of Art Deco architecture in Jacksonville entertainment venues. The Mid-century modern Jacksonville Coliseum was built in 1960 and designed by A. Eugene Cellar and George Ryad Fisher. Demolished in 2003, the building exhibited what is now coined as Googie architecture. Built in the International Style in 1962, the Times-Union Center for the Performing Arts is one of many examples of buildings designed locally by the firm of Kemp, Bunch & Jackson. The newest addition to the local entertainment venue stock is the Populous designed Daily's Place. Completed in 2017, the venue is attached to the southern edge of Everbank Field.

Sports venues
Jacksonville is home to several major sports venues, most notably EverBank Field, home stadium facility of the Jacksonville Jaguars of the National Football League (NFL). Completed in 1995, it was designed by the architecture firm HOK Sport. Opening in 2003, the Postmodern styled Baseball Grounds of Jacksonville and Veterans Memorial Arena were both designed by the architecture firm Populous.

Transportation architecture
 1895 Flagler Depot (partially demolished in 1918)
 1919 Union Station, Beaux-arts, Kenneth M. Murchison and W.B.W. Howe
 1968 Original Jacksonville International Airport Terminal
 2005 Jacksonville International Airport

Parks and historic sites
 1564 Fort Caroline (destroyed in 1568; reconstructed in late 20th century)
 1797 Kingsley Plantation
 1852 Old City Cemetery
 1857 Hemming Park (originally City Park) 
 1878 Old St. Luke's Hospital 314 North Palmetto
 1899 Klutho Park (originally Springfield Park)
 1919 Memorial Park, Olmsted Brothers and Roy A. Benjamin
 1947 American Red Cross Volunteer Life Saving Corps Station, Art Moderne, Jefferson Davis Powell
 1965 Friendship Fountain, Mid-century modern, Taylor Hardwick

Tallest buildings

The 10 tallest standard structures:

Chronology of the tallest buildings in Jacksonville:

Accolades
"Florida Architecture: 100 places, 100 years", compiled by the Florida chapter of the American Institute of Architects.

Styles and schools
Jacksonville architects used many design styles and belonged to a variety of architectural schools.  Below is a list of those styles and schools.

American Four-Square
Art Deco/Moderne
Beaux-Arts
Brutalism
Chicago School (also known as Commercial Style)
Classical Revival (also known as Neoclassical architecture)
Colonial Revival
Craftsman (also known as American Craftsman)
Dutch Colonial
Eastlake/Stick
Egyptian Revival
Gothic Revival
International
Mediterranean Revival
Modern
Prairie School
Queen Anne
Renaissance Revival (also known as Neo-Renaissance)
Shotgun
Spanish Revival (also known as Spanish Colonial Revival)
Tudor Revival

See also

List of tallest buildings in Jacksonville
National Register of Historic Places listings in Duval County, Florida

References

Further reading
 Wood, Wayne W., Davis, Judy (1989). Jacksonville's Architectural Heritage: Landmarks for the Future. University Press of Florida. 
 Broward, Robert (1984). The Architecture of Henry John Klutho. University Press of Florida. 
 Hochstim, Jan (2005). Florida Modern: Residential Architecture 1945-1970. Rizzoli. 
 King, Joseph (2005). Paul Rudolph: The Florida Houses. Princeton Architectural Press. 
 McCarter, Robert (2002). William Morgan, Selected and Current Works. Images Publishing Group. 
 Taylor Hardwick (2014). Taylor Hardwick: 60 Years of Design. Taylor Hardwick.

External links
Jacksonville Planning and Development Dept.
America Institute of Architecture - Jacksonville

 
Jacksonville, Florida
Jacksonville, Florida-related lists
Buildings and structures in Jacksonville, Florida
Jacksonville